{{DISPLAYTITLE:C2H2O}}
The molecular formula C2H2O (molar mass: 42.04 g/mol, exact mass: 42.0106 u) may refer to:

 Ethenone, or ketene
 Ethynol, or hydroxylacetylene
 Oxirene